Nawabpet is a Mandal in Mahbubnagar district, Telangana.

Villages
The villages in Nawabpet mandal include:

Rekulachowdapur 
 Ammapur 
 Chowdoor 	
Dayapantula pally
 Deepalle 	
 Gurkunta 	
 Hajilapur 	
 Ippatur 	
 Kakarjala 	
 Kakarlapahad
 KAMARAM 	
 Karkonda 	
 Karoor 	
 Khanapur 	
 Kolloor 	
 Kondapur 	
 Kuchoor 	
 Lingampalle
 Lokirev 	
 Nawabpet 	
 Pomal 		
 Rudraram 	
 Siddotam 	
 Teegala Palle 	
 Yenmanagandla

References

Mandals in Mahbubnagar district